Belonging may refer to:

 Belongingness, the need to belong
 Belonging (TV series), a Welsh television drama series
 "Belonging" (Angel), a 2001 episode of the television series Angel
 "Belonging" (Dollhouse), a 2009 episode of the television series Dollhouse
 Belonging (album), a 1974 Keith Jarrett album
 Belonging (film), a 1922 British silent crime film

See also
Belong (disambiguation)